I Met a Lady is a 1961 novel by the British writer Howard Spring. During the First World War a boy is sent from Manchester to stay in Cornwall due to improve his health. There he meets an unusual group of characters who influence him strongly and intertwine with his life over the coming decades.

References

Bibliography
 George Watson & Ian R. Willison. The New Cambridge Bibliography of English Literature, Volume 4. CUP, 1972.

1961 British novels
Novels by Howard Spring
Novels set in Manchester
Novels set in Cornwall
William Collins, Sons books